Michael Anthony Davis (born August 2, 1956) is an American former professional basketball player. Playing as a center, his career mostly took place in Italy and Spain, though he had a short stint in the National Basketball Association (NBA).

College career
Born and raised in Jacksonville, Florida, Davis did not play high-school basketball, as he didn't make his school's team in 11th grade.
However, after growing to 6-10, he took up the sport again. 
He moved to Shaw College, Detroit, in 1974, living in Dave Bing's house.

As a sophomore, he played for Mercer County Community College, earning National Junior College Athletic Association All-American honours.

Davis then moved to Maryland, playing in the Atlantic Coast Conference (ACC) of the NCAA Division I, in 1976.
He was an ACC Rookie of the week in 1976–1977, also being noted for his play that season, only his third of competitive basketball.
However, in January 1978, he was kicked off the squad by coach Lefty Driesell after disagreements between the two, he stayed on scholarship at Maryland.

Professional career
Going undrafted in 1978, David moved to the Italian Serie A where he would stay four years.
Returning to the US in 1982, he joined the New York Knicks, played in the summer league and exhibition games but was cut just before the season began.

The center then joined Continental Basketball Association side Albany Patroons.
After averaging 16.5 points, 10.5 rebounds (a league second best) per game with the Patroons, he was re-signed by the Knicks on 23 February 1983 on a 10-day contract to replace the injured Vince Taylor.
He did not play during that period, nor when he signed a new 10-day contract but was finally signed to a permanent contract in March 1983 until the end of the season.
Davis scored 5 points in six minutes on his NBA debut, he would play in 8 games, averaging 1.8 points, 1.3 rebounds and 0.5 blocks in 3.5 minutes per game.

After being released by the Knicks at the end of the season, he returned to Europe, this time with Spanish Liga ACB side Barcelona in 1983.
With the Spaniards he would win the 1985 European Cup Winners' Cup and the 1985 Club World Cup.

References

External links
Liga ACB player profile Retrieved 8 July 2015 
Lega Basket Serie A profile Retrieved 15 June 2015 

1956 births
Living people
Albany Patroons players
American expatriate basketball people in France
American expatriate basketball people in Italy
American expatriate basketball people in Spain
American men's basketball players
Basket Napoli players
Basketball players from Jacksonville, Florida
FC Barcelona Bàsquet players
Junior college men's basketball players in the United States
Lega Basket Serie A players
Liga ACB players
Limoges CSP players
Maryland Terrapins men's basketball players
New York Knicks players
Pallalcesto Amatori Udine players
Pallacanestro Pavia players
Pallacanestro Treviso players
Pallacanestro Virtus Roma players
Power forwards (basketball)